The old states of Germany is a jargon referring to the ten of the sixteen states of the Federal Republic of Germany (FRG) that were part of West Germany and that unified with the eastern German Democratic Republic's 5 states, which are given the contrasting term new states of Germany. Usage of this terminology usually excludes one other state, Berlin, conterminous with the capital city of the reunified nation which used to be divided, with its western part linked with West Germany.

The old states are Baden-Württemberg, Bavaria, Bremen, Hamburg, Hesse, Lower Saxony, North Rhine-Westphalia, Rhineland-Palatinate, Saarland, and Schleswig-Holstein. The state of Berlin, the result of a merger between East and West Berlin, is usually not considered one of the old states although West Berlin was associated with the Federal Republic of Germany, but its status was disputed because of the Four Power Agreement on Berlin.

Demographics

In the old states, the populations also developed differently. In Baden-Württemberg, Bavaria, Hamburg, Hesse and Schleswig-Holstein, the population increased steadily. In Saarland, on the other hand, the population dropped steadily. The population of North Rhine-Westphalia (until 2004), Lower Saxony and Rhineland-Palatinate (both until 2003) initially increased and then fell off again. The population of Bremen dropped until the year 2001, then rose to the year 2007 and began to fall again in 2008.

Since 1980, birth rates have been relatively constant.

Migration

There are more migrants in former West Germany than in former East Germany.

Religion
Eurostat's Eurobarometer survey in 2015, found that Christians comprised 81.4% of the total population; by denomination, Catholics were 37.1%, members of the Protestant Churches were 36.5%, members of other Christian denominations were 7.2%, the Christian Orthodox were 0.6%. Around 6.7% of the adult population themselves as agnostics or non believer, while 7.4% declared themselves as atheists. Muslims comprised 2.8% of the total population.

Economy

The standard of living and annual income remains significantly higher in the old states. In former West Germany, there is more income than in the East.

In former West Germany, there were smaller farms than in the east.

In the old states there are fewer unemployed than in the new states.

Politics
In the West and West Berlin the Union, SPD, FDP and Greens are stronger, but right-wing populist parties and The Left are weaker than in the east.

Unlike in the East, there are not 3 or 4 (since 2016) equally-strong parties but a "two-party dominance" of the SPD and CDU.

A study of the University of Berlin from 1998–1999 comes to 13% for the whole of Germany, and 12% for the West and 17% for the East for right-wing extremist recruitment potential. In the 2017 Federal Election, AfD reached ~ 22% in the East and ~ 11% in the West.

There is also a higher voter turnout in the West.

See also
New states of Germany
Central Germany
Wessi

References

Society of Germany
Political history of Germany
German reunification
Regions of Germany